Dekh Le is a viral video dealing with the subject of men ogling women in India.  It was produced by film studies students at Mumbai-based Whistling Woods International Institute of Film, Fashion & Media and released on 16 December 2013, the first anniversary of the 2012 Delhi gang rape.  It garnered one million hits in its first week on YouTube.

Background
On 16 December 2012, a horrific gang-rape of an Indian girl took place in a crowded moving bus in New Delhi, the national capital of India. The event was followed by various protests in which masses took to the streets in various Indian states, demanding the government to form stricter laws regarding women's public safety. The media industry voiced its concern in its own way. One such way was the women-empowerment ad campaign 'Dekh Le', launched one year after the incident.

Content
The 90 second video shows four different scenarios where women are made to feel uneasy and uncomfortable by male gaze in everyday life situations. It shows women at a red light, in a bus, on a train and at a cafe, being subjected to leering male eyes. In order to retaliate, these women show mirrors to the men; on seeing how bad they look while staring at a girl, realize their mistake and are forced to take their eyes off.  The video concludes with the four empowered women going about their business, free from prying eyes.

Song 
The jingle was sung by Sona Mohapatra and composed by Indian composer Ram Sampath. The hook line "Dekh Le Tu Dekhta Hua Kaisa Dikhta Hai" translates as "Look how you look while you are looking at me."

Reception 
The advert received a lot of media coverage, both on online news websites and blogs, as well as in physical newspapers and magazines.
Rheana Murray from New York Daily News described the video: "Video from Indian arts group shows leering men what they look like."
Deepa Kunapuli from Upworthy wrote "It's meant to start a conversation about what empowerment for women looks like."
Emma Cueto from Bustle writes, "The video is great, both in its very realistic – and uncomfortable – portrayal of men staring at young women, and also in the message it is trying to send. Hopefully it has a big impact, and not just in India."
Aditi Shome Ray from DNA described the ad: "This ad on women empowerment will make men cast their eyes down in shame."
IBNLive described the ad as " The commercial sends out a strong message to show how ridiculous men look like while ogling at women."
As of 8 December 2018, the video stands at more than 6.1 million views on YouTube and has also hit the theatre screens of India.

References

External links

Indian advertising slogans
2013 neologisms
2013 films
Feminism in India
Indian feminist films
Films about social issues in India
Indian short films
Public service announcements
Sexual harassment in India
Viral videos